Aromobates alboguttatus (common name: whitebelly rocket frog) is a species of frog in the family Aromobatidae. It is endemic to the Andes in the Táchira and Mérida states, western Venezuela.The synonymy of Colostethus inflexus is still not fully resolved.

The natural habitat of Aromobates alboguttatus is clear, fast-flowing streams in Andean cloud forest. The male protects the eggs that are laid on land. After hatching, the male carries the tadpoles on his back to water where they develop further.

Aromobates alboguttatus is threatened by habitat loss caused by agriculture, involving both crops and livestock, as well as by logging. Introduced trout are also a threat. It is also declining in undisturbed habitats, suggesting additional threats such as disease (e.g., chytridiomycosis).

References

alboguttatus
Amphibians of the Andes
Amphibians of Venezuela
Endemic fauna of Venezuela
Taxonomy articles created by Polbot
Amphibians described in 1903